The wall-roosting mouse-eared bat, or Nepalese whiskered myotis (Myotis muricola) is a species of vesper bat whose type locality is Nepal.

Taxonomic notes
Myotis muricola was previously classified as a subspecies of Myotis mystacinus but genetic studies indicate that M. muricola represents a complex of species.

Morphology
The upper side of M.muricola is coloured brown or grey with dark bases and the underside has dark bases and light brown tips. The ears are moderately long, slender, bent forwards and bluntly pointed (Francis, 2008). M.muricola has small feet with wing membranes attached at the base of the toes. The tail is long and completely enclosed in the interfemoral membrane. It has three pairs of premolars, with the upper canine much longer than the third premolar. The second premolar is small and slightly intruded from the tooth row (Yasuma, Andau, Apin, Tuh Yit Yu, & Kimsui, 2003).

Distributions
Myotis muricola is found in Afghanistan, Bangladesh, Bhutan, Cambodia, India, Indonesia, Laos, Malaysia, Myanmar, Nepal, Pakistan, Papua New Guinea, the Philippines, Thailand, and Vietnam (Simmons, 2005).

Ecology
Myotis muricola is a nocturnal and insectivorous bat. It tends to feed during the first two hours after sunset and before dawn, using ultrasonic echolocation (Richardson, 1993). It catches insects in flight or perched on foliage, the ground or a water surface. Small insects are usually caught directly in the mouth, while larger ones are scooped out of the air using the tail membrane and flipped into the mouth, or brought to the mouth with the wing tips (Bonaccooso, 1998). It drinks by swooping low over the surface of a body of water or collecting droplets of water from the roof of tunnels or caves in which it roosts (Richardson, 1993).

Habitat
Myotis muricola roosts in a variety of different sites, including curled-up banana leaves (Francis, 2008), limestone forests (Abdullah, Azlan, & Neuchlos, 2005), hollow trees, rock shelters, artificial caves, mines and tunnels, and old buildings (Richardson, 1993).

Conservation status
According to the 2019 IUCN Red List of Threatened Species, M. muricola is classified as Least Concern.

References

Francis, C.M., Guillén, A., Robinson, M.F. (1999). Order Chiroptera: Bats. Wildlife of Lao PDR: 1999 Status Report .

Mouse-eared bats
Bats of Asia
Bats of Oceania
Bats of Southeast Asia
Bats of Indonesia
Bats of Malaysia
Mammals of Afghanistan
Mammals of Pakistan
Mammals of Nepal
Mammals of Bangladesh
Mammals of Bhutan
Mammals of Brunei
Mammals of Cambodia
Mammals of China
Mammals of India
Mammals of Laos
Mammals of Myanmar
Mammals of Papua New Guinea
Mammals of the Philippines
Mammals of Singapore
Mammals of Taiwan
Mammals of Thailand
Mammals of Vietnam
Mammals of Western New Guinea
Taxonomy articles created by Polbot
Mammals described in 1846
Bats of New Guinea